Elizabeth McMaster (December 27, 1847 – March 3, 1903) was a Canadian humanitarian and head of the committee which founded the Hospital for Sick Children in Toronto.

In her forties and after her husband's death in 1888, she trained to become a nurse in Chicago at Illinois Training School for Nurses, which merged in 1926 into the University of Chicago's School of Nursing and ceased to exist in 1929. Graduating in 1891 McMaster left Chicago to work at the Hospital of the Good Samaritan in Los Angeles and Children's Home, an orphanage in Schenectady, New York. She later returned to Chicago, where she died in 1903.

The Great Ormond Street Hospital was the influence for her to establish the Hospital for Sick Children.

References

External links 
 Elizabeth McMaster biography - sickkids.ca.

1847 births
1903 deaths
Canadian humanitarians
Women humanitarians
Canadian nurses
Canadian women nurses
People from Old Toronto
People from Chicago